Stanisław Car (26 April 1882 – 18 June 1938) was a Polish politician, lawyer, Marshal of the Sejm, deputy Prime Minister and the Minister of Justice.

Life  
Born on 26 April 1882 into a Warsaw middle-class family, he studied law at the University of Warsaw (until 1905), and then at the University of Odessa, where he graduated in 1907. In 1908–1911, Car worked as a clerk in a court, opening then his own legal office. In 1915, he became a judge, and a member of the Commission of Civil Law of the Provisional Council of State.

For most of the 1920s, Car worked in his office. In 1924, he opened a magazine of Warsaw lawyers, “Palestra”, of which he was the first editor in chief. After the May Coup of 1926, he returned to politics. A close associate of Jozef Pilsudski, he remained loyal to the Polish Marshal until Pilsudski's death in May 1935.

Car was a prominent member of the pro-Sanacja party Nonpartisan Bloc for Support of Reforms (BBWR). He co-wrote the April Constitution of Poland.

Stanislaw Car died in Warsaw on 18 June 1938.

Awards  
 Order of the White Eagle, posthumously on June 20, 1938, 
 Great Ribbon of the Order of Polonia Restituta, 1935, 
 Commander's Cross of the Order of Polonia Restituta (May 2, 1922), 
 Officer Cross of the Legion of Honour (France).

1882 births
1938 deaths
Politicians from Warsaw
People from Warsaw Governorate
Government ministers of Poland
Marshals of the Sejm of the Second Polish Republic
Deputy Marshals of the Sejm of the Second Polish Republic
Members of the Sejm of the Second Polish Republic (1930–1935)
Members of the Sejm of the Second Polish Republic (1935–1938)